Zhiguli may refer to:
Zhiguli Mountains, a forested mountain range by river Volga in the Samara oblast.
Zhiguli (car brand), a Soviet/Russian car brand
Zhiguli (beer brand), a brand of Soviet/Russian beer. There was an attempt to market it in Britain under the name "Zhiguli's".